Daukša is the masculine form of a Lithuanian family name. Its feminine forms  are: Daukšienė (married woman or widow) and Daukšaitė (unmarried woman).

The surname may refer to:

Mikalojus Daukša, Lithuanian writer
Edvardas Jokūbas Daukša, Lithuanian writer 
Česlovas Daukša, Lithuanian basketball player

Lithuanian-language surnames